Timothy J. Hawker (born May 8, 1980) is an American boccia player.

References

Boccia players at the 2000 Summer Paralympics
Boccia players at the 2004 Summer Paralympics
Boccia players at the 2008 Summer Paralympics
1980 births
Living people
Paralympic boccia players of the United States
Place of birth missing (living people)